Yeah Yeah Yeah Yeah is the Bikini Kill side of a split album released in 1993 on Kill Rock Stars. The other side featured Huggy Bear's Our Troubled Youth. In 1994, Bikini Kill released the compilation The C.D. Version of the First Two Records which featured Yeah Yeah Yeah Yeah along with their 1992 self-titled EP.

Yeah Yeah Yeah Yeah was released as a standalone LP by Bikini Kill Records on April 15, 2004. This release, which did not feature the Huggy Bear tracks due to rights, was expanded with unreleased tracks recorded at live shows and band practices. This expanded tracklisting was also featured on a re-release of The First Two Records in 2015.

Track listing

Side A

Side B (expanded version only)

References 

1993 albums
Bikini Kill albums
Kill Rock Stars albums
Split albums